Dean Carroll (third ¼ 1962 – 24 May 2015), also known by the nickname of "Deano", was an English professional rugby league footballer and cricketer who played in the 1980s and 1990s. 

Having suffered a number of minor strokes in the past, he was found unconscious at home in Batley during the early-afternoon of Wednesday 19 May 2015, and he suffered heart attacks en route to Dewsbury and District Hospital, Dewsbury before being transferred to    Pinderfields Hospital, Wakefield, having suffered cerebral hypoxia. Never regaining consciousness, life support was removed on Saturday 23 May 2015, and he died during the morning of Sunday 24 May 2015.

Background
Carroll was born in Spen Valley West Riding of Yorkshire, England.

Playing career

County Cup Final appearances
Dean Carroll played , and scored a goal, and a 2-drop goals in Bradford Northern's 7–18 defeat by Hull F.C. in the 1982–83 Yorkshire County Cup Final during the 1982–83 season at Elland Road, Leeds on Saturday 2 October 1982.

Club career
Dean Carroll initially played rugby league for St John Fisher Catholic School, and Batley Boys ARLFC before joining Bradford Northern. He made his début for Bradford Northern against Blackpool Borough in 1980. Following the arrival of Wales international rugby union scrum-half Terry Holmes from Cardiff RFC in 1985, Dean Carroll felt his first-team opportunities at Bradford Northern would be limited, and consequently he transferred to Carlisle. In hindsight, the number of injuries sustained by Terry Holmes would actually have meant more opportunities at Bradford Northern than Dean Carroll had envisaged. He made his début for Warrington on Sunday 5 March 1989, and he played his last match for Warrington on Sunday 16 April 1989.

Outside of rugby league
Dean Carroll was a pupil at St Mary's Catholic Primary School in Batley and St John Fisher Catholic School in Dewsbury, during his working life he was employed at Fox's Biscuits, Batley. Dean Carroll's funeral took place St Mary of the Angels Roman Catholic Church at 10am on Wednesday 3 June 2015, followed by interment at Batley Cemetery, and a reception at Staincliffe Cricket & Working Mens Club.

Genealogical information
Dean had a son Paul, and three grandchildren, he was the younger brother of Linda Carroll (birth registered during first ¼  in Spen Valley district), the rugby league footballer for Bramley, and coach for Dewsbury Celtic ARLFC, Stephen "Steve" Carroll (birth registered during fourth ¼  in Spen Valley district), the older brother of James Carroll (birth registered during first ¼  in Spen Valley district), and the cousin of the rugby league footballer for Leeds, Halifax and Hull FC, John Carroll.

References

External links
Photograph 'Dean Carroll – 17 year old colt stand off Dean Carroll made his senior début against Blackpool. – 23/03/1980' at rlhp.co.uk
Photograph '"Knocker" held – "Knocker" Norton is held by Alan Redfearn and Dean Carroll. – 21/02/1982' at rlhp.co.uk
Photograph 'Referee Whitfield sends another man off – Referee Whitfield dismisses someone else in today's controversial game at Craven Park. – 03/05/1982' at rlhp.co.uk
Statistics at wolvesplayers.thisiswarrington.co.uk

1962 births
2015 deaths
Batley Bulldogs players
Bradford Bulls players
Carlisle RLFC players
Doncaster R.L.F.C. players
English rugby league players
Rugby league fullbacks
Rugby league halfbacks
Rugby league five-eighths
Rugby league players from Batley
Warrington Wolves players